The Indonesian Independence Cup (Indonesian: Piala Kemerdekaan) was an international football tournament organised by the Football Association of Indonesia to commemorate the independence day of the Republic of Indonesia. The tournament was held nine times from 1985 until its last edition in 2008.

Summary 

Notes

Teams
 8
 7
 5
 5
 6
 5
 8
 4
 6

Medals

Results
https://www.rsssf.org/tablesp/pialakemerdekaan.html

References 

International association football competitions hosted by Indonesia
Indonesia Independence Cup
1985 establishments in Indonesia
Recurring sporting events established in 1985